Lieutenant General Leif Michael Claesson (born 1 March 1965) is a Swedish Army officer. He currently serves at the Chief of the Defence Staff since 1 January 2023. Prior to this, he served as Chief of Policy and Plans Department in the Defence Staff from 2018 to 2020 and as Chief of Joint Operations from 2020 to 2022.

Early life
Claesson was born on 1 March 1965 in Jönköping and grew up in Bankeryd, where he lived until he commenced his military service in 1984.

Career
He did his military service as a company commander operating Stridsvagn 103 tanks in the Norrbotten Armoured Battalion (I 19/P 5) in Boden from 4 June 1984 to 31 August 1985. He then attended the Officershögskolan pansar and the Swedish Armoured Troops Combat School (Pansartruppernas stridsskola, PS) in Skövde from 1985 to 1987 when he was promoted to second lieutenant. From 1 August 1986, Claesson served as an instructor, platoon leader and battalion staff member of a tank company and an armored battalion respectively in the Scanian Dragoon Regiment (Skånska dragonregementet, P 2) in Hässleholm. He also did two years as a teacher at the company management course (KHS HK) at the Swedish Armoured Troops Combat School in Skövde. Claesson attended the Military Academy Karlberg's general course in Stockholm from 1988 to 1989 when he was promoted to lieutenant. He also attended the higher course from 1990 to 1991 when he was promoted to captain, and the Tactical Course for the Army (Taktisk kurs för Armén, TAK A) at the Swedish National Defence College in Stockholm from 1994 to 1995. Promoted to major in 1995, Claesson served between 1 July 1995 to 31 January 1997 as company commander and deputy company commander of the 83rd Staff Company and the 86th Tank Company in the Scanian Dragoon Regiment in Hässleholm. He was then a student at the German Armed Forces Language Agency (Bundessprachenamt, BSprA) in Hürth, Germany from 1 February 1997 to 31 August 1997. He was then the first Swedish student in Germany's national general staff training at the Bundeswehr Command and Staff College in Hamburg, Germany from 1 September 1997 to 30 September 1999.

Claesson served as a teacher of tactics and operational art at the Swedish National Defence College's Operational Institution (Operativa institution, FHS OpI) from 1 October 1999 to 30 August 2000 and he was Deputy Section Chief at KFOR HQ Operations Department (J 3 PLANS&CONOPS) in Pristina, Kosovo from 1 September 2000 to 30 April 2001. Promoted to lieutenant colonel in 2001, he served as a staff officer (administrator) in the Policy and Plans Department of the Strategic Plans and Policy Directorate (Strategiledningens inriktningsavdelning, STRA INRI) at the Swedish Armed Forces Headquarters in Stockholm from 1 September 2001 to 31 October 2002. Claesson then served as a military expert at the Ministry of Defence's Unit for Security Policy and International Affairs (Enheten för säkerhetspolitik och internationella frågor, Fö SI) from 1 November 2002 to 30 April 2003 and as commander and head of and training of Norrbotten Armoured Battalion in Norrbotten Regiment (I 19) in Boden from 1 May 2003 to 28 February 2005. He was then back at the Ministry of Defence's Unit for Security Policy and International Affairs, serving from 1 March 2005 to 31 July 2005. Claesson served as a military adviser and assistant military representative to Sweden's delegation to NATO at the NATO headquarters in Brussels and was accredited to Sweden's Permanent Representation to the EU from 1 August 2005 to 31 August 2007, then from 1 September 2007 to 31 August 2009. He was promoted to colonel in 2008.

Claesson served as exercise director (EXDIR) with responsibility for the Army's final exercises in 2010 and the training series for Nordic Battlegroup 11 (NBG 11) and as commanding officer of the Land Warfare Centre in Skövde from 1 September 2009 to 30 November 2010 and then from 1 December 2010 to 30 April 2012. He was commanding officer of the 24th Swedish contingent (FS 24) of the International Security Assistance Force (ISAF) as well as tactical commander of the multinational Task Force Northern Lights, Regional Command North of ISAF in Afghanistan from 1 May 2012 to 23 June 2013. Promoted to brigadier general in 2013, he served as a military adviser to the Ministry for Foreign Affairs in Stockholm from 24 June 2013 to 28 February 2015. Claesson was then Deputy Chief of Policy and Plans Department in the Defence Staff at the Swedish Armed Forces Headquarters from 1 March 2015 to 30 September 2018. He was promoted to major general and appointed Chief of Policy and Plans Department in the Defence Staff on 1 October 2018. On 25 June 2020, Claesson was appointed Chief of Joint Operations, succeeding Vice Admiral Jan Thörnqvist. Claesson assumed the position on 10 September 2020. He was promoted to lieutenant general on the same date. Also on 10 September 2020, Claesson assumed the position of Commandant General in Stockholm.

On 30 June 2022, the Swedish government appointed Claesson as Chief of the Defence Staff in the Swedish Armed Forces Headquarters from 1 January 2023. The then Chief of Air Force, Major General Carl-Johan Edström succeeded Claesson as Chief of Joint Operations as commander of the new Unit for Joint Operations. Edström was also promoted to lieutenant general.

Personal life
In 1988, he married Åsa, a nurse, with whom he has three children.

Dates of rank

1987-09-01 – Second lieutenant
1989-07-01 – Lieutenant
1991-06-01 – Captain
1995-07-01 – Major
2001-04-01 – Lieutenant colonel
2008-03-03 – Colonel (brevet colonel from 1 August 2007)
2013-06-24 – Brigadier general
2018-10-01 – Major general
2020-09-10 – Lieutenant general

Awards and decorations

Swedish
  For Zealous and Devoted Service of the Realm
  Swedish Armed Forces Conscript Medal
  Swedish Armed Forces International Service Medal (ISAF, Afghanistan & KFOR, Kosovo May 2013)
  Scanian Dragoon Regiment Commemorative Medal 1
  Scanian Dragoon Regiment Commemorative Medal 2

Foreign
  Officer of the Ordre national du Mérite
  Badge of Honour of the Bundeswehr in Silver (April 2007)
  NATO Medal, ISAF, Afghanistan (March 2013)
  NATO Medal, KFOR, Kosovo (April 2001)
  Cross for the Four Day Marches
 Norwegian Chief of Defence's medal for international efforts in ISAF, Afghanistan (May 2013)

Honours
Member of the Royal Swedish Academy of War Sciences, Department I, Land Warfare Studies (2010)
Member of the Folke Bernadotte Academy's advisory council (2016)
Head of the Kungafonden ("The King's Fund")

Footnotes

References

External links

CV

1965 births
Living people
Swedish Army lieutenant generals
People from Jönköping
Members of the Royal Swedish Academy of War Sciences